Lieutenant General Karl Friedrich Bernhard Helmuth von Hobe (16 October 1765 in Jürgenstorf – 25 December 1822 in Cologne) was a German officer of the Prussian Army during the Napoleonic Wars and the War of the Seventh Coalition. He was a Knight of the Order Pour le Mérite (awarded 1814 with Oak Leaves).

See also
 Hobe (family)

Notes

References

1765 births
1822 deaths
Recipients of the Pour le Mérite (military class)
Prussian commanders of the Napoleonic Wars
Lieutenant generals of Prussia
Military personnel from Mecklenburg-Western Pomerania